Dr Al Haskey is a fictional character from the BBC soap opera Doctors, portrayed by Ian Midlane. He first appeared during the episode broadcast on 13 November 2012. His storylines in the programme have included stalking Jas Khella (Vineeta Rishi), his friendship with colleague Jimmi Clay (Adrian Lewis Morgan) and dealing with his mother's dementia.

Development

Characterisation
Al was introduced into the series as a "cynical" general practitioner. Writers partnered him with Jimmi Clay (Adrian Lewis Morgan), who is "uptight" and initially struggles to get along with Al. He is immediately given a dramatic story in which a patient is stabbed and Jimmi leaves Al to tend to his injuries. A writer from BBC Online described Al as not being a typical GP because he is "lazy, sarcastic and a bit of a glutton." Al is happy to accept accusations of hypocrisy and dislikes "time wasters and anything that’s too saccharine". Writers also gave the character a side hobby as an inventor, with Al having become interested in making gadgets as a child. In 2013, Midlane opined that the character was conflicted over science and religion in his mind. He added that finding love is the "greatest mystery of all for Al."

Stalker mystery
When writers created Al they devised a stalker mystery story that featured him and fellow doctor Jas Khella (Vineeta Rishi). The latter becomes to victim of a stalking campaign which leads her colleagues to believe that Al is the culprit. The story was devised by storyliner Loretta Preece and it was inspired after she heard a chance conversation. Preece thought about how people are affected by intrusion and thought it was be an interesting topic to explore on the show. Midlane was informed about the story when he auditioned for the role. When Al and Jas shared their first scenes, he was portrayed as having an instant attraction to her. Midlane claimed that this was a deliberate "seed" planted by writers to make him a suspect.

The story received a slow buildup on-screen and Midlane found it "really satisfying" and "rewarding to take Al to the brink". He told Daniel Kilkelly from Digital Spy that he did not think Al was a stalker but did think he harassed Jas. In one incident Al is found outside Jas' home, a plot device which makes him a strong suspect.

Midlane explained that Jas makes Al feel good and a number of personal grievances make him vulnerable. Al was "broke" and had no one to support him and "he started this peculiar behaviour [...] Jas became a comfort to him, a hope of better things. In looking after her, he could heal himself. Then circumstance made things really, really bad." Writers played Al becoming disliked at work, with Zara Carmichael (Elisabeth Dermot Walsh) and Kevin Tyler (Simon Rivers) being the first colleagues to turn against him. Midlane said that "Al doesn't feel loved at work, so if he feels humiliated and disappointed by the way they react to him, he isn't surprised by it." Jas' stalker is later revealed to be a patient named Gus Harper (Neil Haigh). The story culminates in Gus taking Al hostage in his cellar and tying him up. He then uses Al's mobile phone to lure Jas to his home and she discovers the truth.

Relationships
In 2014, Midlane signed a new contract to remain in Doctors due to the range of stories writers conjured up for him. His first romance story soon followed and they paired him with Niamh Donoghue (Jessica Regan). The story begins with Niamh developing feelings for Al, which he does not respond well to. Midlane explained that Al is still reminded of what happened with Jas and struggles to trust Niamh. He added "when someone seems to come to Al with warmth and real affection, he presses the alarm button."

Al and Niamh are both looking for someone to spend their lives with. They both want to settle down and commit, but Midlane noted "I think it'll be a question of whether one of them is really suitable for doing that." Another issue is that Al lacks "emotional intelligence" and it is a "real struggle for him to open up his heart". The actor enjoyed filming the story and believed that viewers would enjoy watching Al and Niamh's "blossoming romance."

Writers have developed a double-act between Al and Jimmi. The pair were played as friends from Al's debut, with Midlane and Morgan later being nominated for a "Best On-Screen Partnership" award in recognition of their work together. In 2019, writers created a new business venture story for the pair as they open a new bar called The Icon. The story adds comic relief as their opening night is marred by their house beer going missing during transit.

Flashback episode
Producers decided to create an episode centric to Al's backstory via the use of flashbacks scenes. The scenes portray a young Al at school where he is bullied by fellow students. The episode also explains how the character became obsessed with science fiction and explores his relationship with his aunt Sheila Mills (Helen Phillips). In the scenes Al is played by Xandi Steele.

Reception
In 2013, Midlane revealed that he did not like to read about negative opinions about Al posted by viewers on social media because they left him with "hurt feelings". During his second month on-screen, an Inside Soap reporter opined that Al has a "lamentable lack of bedside manner" and he behaved with a lack of "appropriate sensitivity".

For his portrayal of Al, Midlane the award for Acting Performance at the RTS Midlands Awards. Later that year, he was nominated for Best Newcomer at the 2013 British Soap Awards, and then received a longlist nomination for Best Actor at the 2014 and 2015 ceremonies. Midlane won the Best Comedy Performance accolade at the 2018 British Soap Awards. At the 2019 ceremony, Midlane and Morgan received a Best On-Screen Partnership, and he was solely nominated for Best Male Dramatic Performance. He was then nominated for Best Daytime Star at the 2019 Inside Soap Awards.

In March 2022, Metros Chris Hallam wrote a piece opining that Al is Doctors best character in the history of the series. He felt that the producers had "struck gold" when they created Al and accredited Midlane's acting skills with the enjoyment of the character. Hallam wrote that in his decade on the soap, Al had "gradually developed into one of the most entertaining and fully realised characters in the Doctors universe". Hallam admitted that Al can be "arrogant and unfeeling towards his colleagues", as well as "bombastic and overbearing, often overeager to impose his opinions on issues trivial and not so trivial", but felt that this contributed to the complexity of the character. He appreciated the depth in the character, comparing the different aspecsts of Al: the "fortysomething mummy’s boy who seems more interested in science fiction, pub quizzes, the latest app or grabbing a pint" in contrast to the "acutely sensitive" person who cares about his friends and patients. Hallam concluded his piece by billing Al as "far more than simple comic relief" and noted that his characterisation was a huge success for the show and its viewers.

References

External links
Al Haskey at BBC Online

Doctors (2000 TV series) characters
Fictional British medical doctors
Fictional stalkers
Television characters introduced in 2012